Rainier may refer to the following:

People
Rainier (name), a list of people with the given name or surname

Places

United States
Rainier, Oregon, a small city
Rainier, Washington, a small city
Rainier Beach, Seattle
Mount Rainier, a stratovolcano and national park southeast of Seattle, Washington, US
Rainier National Forest, a former national forest now divided between Mount Baker-Snoqualmie, Wenatchee and Gifford Pinchot National Forests
Rainier Mesa, Nevada, a nuclear test region

Canada
Rainier, Alberta, a hamlet

Sports
Tacoma Rainiers, a minor league baseball team of the Pacific Coast League
Seattle Rainiers, a defunct minor league baseball team in Seattle, Washington, that last played in 1976

Watercraft
USS Rainier, several United States Navy ships
NOAAS Rainier (S 221), a National Oceanic and Atmospheric Administration hydrographic survey ship in service from 1968 to 1995 and since 1999

Other
Rainier (Link station), a light rail station in Seattle
Rainier Brewing Company, based in Washington, United States
Buick Rainier, a mid-sized sport utility vehicle from General Motors
Rainier cherry, a cultivar of cherry
Rainier Club, a private club in Seattle, Washington
Rainier Heliport, Oregon, a private heliport
 Rainier, the Microsoft pre-release codename for Visual Studio .NET
Rainier Wolfcastle, a recurring character on The Simpsons
Rainier Motor Car Company
Rainier Fog, a 2018 album by Alice in Chains
Rainier, a test nuclear blast, part of Operation Plumbbob

See also
HMS Admiral Rainier (1800), a 16-gun brig captured and used by the British
Mount Rainier (disambiguation)
Rainier High School (disambiguation), several high schools in the United States
Rainer (disambiguation)
Rainier Valley, Seattle, a city neighborhood
Rayner (disambiguation)
Raynor
Reiner (disambiguation)
Reyner